Tenleytown–AU is a subway station on the Red Line of the Washington Metro in Washington, D.C. Located in the Upper Northwest neighborhood, it is the last station on the Red Line heading outbound wholly within the District of Columbia; the next stop, Friendship Heights, lies within both the District and the state of Maryland.

Location

The southernmost station underneath the Wisconsin Avenue NW corridor, Tenleytown–AU station lies within the neighborhood of the same name in the Upper Northwest portion of the city. More specifically, it lies north of Tenley Circle, for which the area is named, below Wisconsin Avenue NW at its intersection with Albemarle Street NW. Nearby are several educational institutions, the most notable of which are: American University (AU, which has its law school on the circle, has its main campus a mile from the station, albeit connected by a shuttle); Sidwell Friends School (famous for being the school of choice of presidential children); Jackson-Reed High School; the high school of Georgetown Day School; and the affiliated National Cathedral School and St Albans Schools. In addition, Fort Reno Park and the Washington National Cathedral are located close to the station.

History
Originally to be called Tenley Circle, in February 1980 the Metro Board officially changed its name to Tenleytown. The station opened on August 25, 1984. In May 1989, although objected to by several community groups, the Metro Board officially changed its name to Tenleytown–AU due to its proximity to American University. The $63,500 cost of changing the names on signs, pylons and maps throughout the system was paid for by the District government.

Station layout 
This station uses the four-coffer arch design found at most underground stations on the western side of the Red Line.

Two entrances on either side of Wisconsin Avenue meet at an upper mezzanine, converging into a set of three long escalators that travel down to the fare control. An elevator adjacent to the eastern surface entrance travels down directly to the platform, with a single fare gate and ticket machine to access the platform proper.

References

External links

 The Schumin Web Transit Center: Tenleytown–AU Station
 Albemarle Street entrance from Google Maps Street View
 West side of Wisconsin Avenue entrance from Google Maps Street View

Stations on the Red Line (Washington Metro)
Washington Metro stations in Washington, D.C.
Railway stations in Washington, D.C., at university and college campuses
Railway stations in the United States opened in 1984
1984 establishments in Washington, D.C.
Tenleytown